Manish Choudhari is an Indian actor who is best known for his character of Sunil Puri in Rocket Singh: Salesman of the Year. He made his film debut in the 2003 Indian film Rules: Pyaar Ka Superhit Formula. He was also seen in the 2021 web-series Aarya.

Career
Chaudhari discovered his passion for acting as a 15-year-old school boy attending St. Paul's School, Darjeeling. After school, while he was completing his B. A. Hons. (English) at Kirori Mal College, Delhi University, he joined the College Theatre Society. In 1995, Chaudhari left Delhi and went to Mumbai, looking for a career in Hindi cinema. Chaudhari was also seen in the web series Aarya as Shekhawat on Disney Plus Hotstar Bombay Begums, directed by Alankrita Shrivastava. Starring Pooja Bhatt, Amruta Subhash, Plabita Borthakur.

TV shows

Filmography

References

External links
   

1994 births
Living people
Indian male television actors
Indian male film actors
St. Paul's School, Darjeeling alumni